The women's 1500 metres in speed skating at the 1976 Winter Olympics took place on February 5, at the Eisschnellaufbahn.

Records
Prior to this competition, the existing world and Olympic records were as follows:

The following new world and olympic record were set during the competition.

Results

References

Women's speed skating at the 1976 Winter Olympics
Olymp
Skat